Brewster is a city in Okanogan County, Washington, United States. The population was 2,370 at the 2010 census.

History
Brewster was founded in 1896. A post office called Brewster has been in operation since 1898. The city derives its name from John Bruster, a pioneer settler.

Geography
Brewster is located on the confluence of the Okanogan and Columbia Rivers.

The 30–bed Three Rivers Hospital serves the city as the largest hospital in the county. The radio telescope located in Brewster is the northernmost of ten dishes comprising the Very Long Baseline Array.

Demographics

2010 census
As of the census of 2010, there were 2,370 people, 699 households, and 535 families living in the city. The racial makeup of the city was 50.8% White, 0.3% African American, 2.2% Native American, 0.2% Asian, 43.0% from other races, and 3.5% from two or more races. Hispanic or Latino of any race were 73.0% of the population.

There were 699 households, of which 54.5% had children under the age of 18 living with them, 52.9% were married couples living together, 15.6% had a female householder with no husband present, 8.0% had a male householder with no wife present, and 23.5% were non-families. 20.5% of all households were made up of individuals, and 10% had someone living alone who was 65 years of age or older. The average household size was 3.31 and the average family size was 3.81.

The median age in the city was 27.6 years. 35.1% of residents were under the age of 18; 11.1% were between the ages of 18 and 24; 26.4% were from 25 to 44; 17.2% were from 45 to 64; and 10% were 65 years of age or older. The gender makeup of the city was 50.4% male and 49.6% female. For population 25 years and older, 50.2% have a high school diploma or higher, 8.1% have a bachelor's degree or higher, and 3.4% have a graduate or professional degree.

2000 census
As of the census of 2000, there were 2,189 people, 662 households, and 485 families living in the city. The population density was 1,828.0 people per square mile (704.3/km2). There were 739 housing units at an average density of 617.1 per square mile (237.8/km2). The racial makeup of the city was 54.91% White, 0.37% African American, 2.28% Native American, 0.27% Asian, 38.78% from other races, and 3.38% from two or more races. Hispanic or Latino of any race were 59.5% of the population.

There were 662 households, out of which 49.2% had children under the age of 18 living with them, 53.3% were married couples living together, 13.6% had a female householder with no husband present, and 26.6% were non-families. 23.4% of all households were made up of individuals, and 14.8% had someone living alone who was 65 years of age or older. The average household size was 3.23 and the average family size was 3.80.

In the city, the population was spread out, with 35.3% under the age of 18, 11.7% from 18 to 24, 26.7% from 25 to 44, 14.6% from 45 to 64, and 11.7% who were 65 years of age or older. The median age was 27 years. For every 100 females, there were 93.0 males. For every 100 females age 18 and over, there were 90.2 males.

The median income for a household in the city was $21,556, and the median income for a family was $22,381. Males had a median income of $15,652 versus $16,154 for females. The per capita income for the city was $9,555. About 29.1% of families and 31.7% of the population were below the poverty line, including 38.0% of those under age 18 and 16.4% of those age 65 or over.

Climate

References

External links
 City of Brewster – Official website
 Brewster Chamber of Commerce
 

Cities in Washington (state)
Cities in Okanogan County, Washington
Washington (state) populated places on the Columbia River
1910 establishments in Washington (state)
Washington (state) populated places on the Okanogan River
Populated places in the Okanagan Country